DWXI (1314 AM) is a radio station owned and operated by Delta Broadcasting System, the media arm of El Shaddai in the Philippines. The station's studio is located at the 7th Floor, Queensway Commercial Tower, 118 Amorsolo St., Legaspi Village, Makati, while its transmitter is located along Gen. Alvarez St., Brgy. San Rafael III, Noveleta. It operates Weekdays from 4:00 AM to 12:00 MN, Saturdays from 5:00 AM to 12:00 MN, and Sundays from 5:00 AM to 11:30 PM. It also broadcasts 24 hours on special occasions especially during overnight celebrations.

As of Q4 2022, DWXI is the 4th most-listened to AM radio station (and #1 among religious radio stations) in Metro Manila, based on a survey commissioned by Kantar Media Philippines and Kapisanan ng mga Brodkaster ng Pilipinas.

History
DZSA was born in the late 1960s. Ernie Baron was part of the anchors of the fledgling station, before he returned to ABS-CBN in 1986. The station then aired an OPM format dubbed as Himpilang Sariling Atin. It was then broadcasting on 1230 kHz until 1978, when it transferred to the present frequency of 1314 kHz, adopting the 9 kHz spacing for AM Broadcasting.

In 1981, at the height of his real estate business expansion around what is now Ninoy Aquino International Airport, Velarde bought DZSA from the original owners of the Delta Broadcasting System for P2 million, because he needed the parcel of land on which it stood. Besides, the owners would not sell the land unless the radio station was included in the deal. The radio station alone would later cost him millions more to sustain its operations. Upon acquisition, he started operating the station following his recovery from a heart ailment to propagate the healing message from the Word of God. This prompted him to established his foundation of the El Shaddai Catholic Charismatic Group in 1984.

After he bought that station from its former compound behind the formerly Manila Bay Casino in Sto. Niño, Parañaque, it moved to Multinational Village in the said city in 1990. In 1998, it transferred to its present location in Legaspi Village in Makati. Back then, it was ranked third among the AM radio stations in Metro and Mega Manila.

In 1998, during El Shaddai's 14th Anniversary Overnight Celebration, DWXI launched a new slogan, "Ang Tunay na Lakas na Galing sa Itaas!", in which the station's transmitting power was upgraded to 30,000 watts. Since October 30, 2019, its programs can be viewed live on YouTube and Facebook, as well as Tuesday and Saturday Family Appointment With El Shaddai Live Streaming, and the Amorsolo Prayer Meetings every Monday, Wednesday, Thursday, and Friday.

See also
DWDE-TV
Delta Broadcasting System
El Shaddai (movement)
Mike Velarde
Roman Catholic Diocese of Parañaque

References

DWXI
Christian radio stations in the Philippines
Radio stations established in 1968